The Ebbw Vale Garden Festival of Wales (National Garden Festival 1992) attracted over two million visitors to Ebbw Vale in South Wales.

Background

The national garden festivals were a high-profile 1980s initiative by the then Conservative government in response to criticism of their alleged neglect of areas hit by the decline of heavy industry. Environment Minister Michael Heseltine proposed that derelict land should be reclaimed for a Garden Festival as a symbol of the rebirth of such areas. The festivals were held every two years. The first such festival was held in Liverpool in 1984. Subsequent festivals were held in Stoke-on-Trent (1986), Glasgow (1988), Gateshead (1990) and Ebbw Vale Garden Festival (1992) which eventually won the competition. The festivals were highly successful in attracting millions of visitors from all over the country to industrial areas long ignored by British tourists. However they did not always lead to the hoped-for long-term injection of private investment in the affected areas.

The festival
Ebbw Vale was chosen as the last British Garden Festival site (1992) because of the waste land which had been the British Steel steel and tin works, part of which had been demolished in the early 1980s. The festival began on 1 May 1992 and ran until 4 October 1992. As well as gardens, plant exhibitions and fairground-style attractions the festival also featured a funicular railway, the Ebbw Vale Garden Festival Funicular.

The Festival Park (Garden Festival) site is now occupied by over 1,000 houses, a fishing lake, Festival Church, an owl sanctuary, a large environmental sculpture of Mother Earth, woodlands and a shopping centre.

Clock

A mechanical clock known as “In the Nick of Time” by sculptor Andy Plant was installed on the site. The clock was commissioned and paid for by Newport Council at a cost of £100,000. On the hour, the structure would open to reveal the hidden characters inside. After the festival event the clock was relocated to John Frost Square, Newport. The clock is currently located on the roundabout leading to the Glan Llyn development behind Newport Retail Park in Newport. The clock no longer opens.

See also 
 Ebbw Vale Garden Festival Funicular

References

External links 

Unofficial Garden Festival Wales website
Festival Church
Festival Park Owl Sanctuary
Funicular Railway

National garden festivals
1992 in Wales
Garden Festival
Garden festivals in Wales
1992 festivals